Bettina Bush, also known professionally and simply as Bettina, is an American actress and pop music singer.

Early life 
She was born the youngest of three children. Her father was Charles V. Bush, the first African-American graduate of the US Air Force Academy and later a business executive, and her mother was of Scottish-Polynesian and Cherokee descent.

Voice acting 
Bettina's professional career began at the age of 5 when she began modeling and acting. Her acting career eventually led to voiceovers, including My Little Pony (as Megan), The Get Along Gang (as Dotty Dog), The Littles (as Lucy Little), Rugrats, All Grown Up!, Stargate Infinity, Ben 10 (as Kai Green), Age of Empires III (as Nonahkee), God Hand (as Olivia), and is perhaps best known as the voice of Rainbow Brite and as the voice of Gloria in the Madagascar video games. She has also performed the McDonald's "I'm Lovin' It" commercial jingles. She starred as Maria, a teenage Native American girl, in the film Journey to Spirit Island (1988).

Musical career 
Her early influences in music include Dolly Parton and Elton John. Bettina's early singing talents can be heard on the title sing "Gift of Love" as the voice/singing voice of Rainbow Brite by Disneyland/Vista Records in 1985, and in the song "Make Room for a Rainbow Inside" again as voice/singing voice of Rainbow Brite in the Rainbow Brite Paint a Rainbow in Your Heart album also produced by Disneyland/Vista Records in 1984. Bettina also performed the songs "Brand New Day" and "Rainbow Brite and Me" for the feature film Rainbow Brite and the Star Stealer. Bettina later created her own record label company and financed, co-wrote, and performed her first independent release entitled "Lucky Girl". In 2006 she was named the winner of American Idol Underground in the pop category. Exposure from the show led to her being offered the opportunity to direct a music video. Along with it came the opportunity for her to co-write and edit three tracks with Sony Music producer/songwriter Automatic (P!nk, India.Arie). With them she has co-written and edited three tracks: “Emerald City”, “Let Me Inside” and “I Can't Deny You”. Her single titled "She Is" reached No. 4 on Billboard's Hot Singles Sales chart. Her debut album was set to be released in January 2008 but was never released.

References

External links 
 
 

Living people
African-American actresses
20th-century African-American women singers
American women pop singers
American voice actresses
20th-century American actresses
21st-century American actresses
21st-century American women singers
21st-century American singers
Year of birth missing (living people)
21st-century African-American women singers